Ehi's Bitters is a 2018 Nigerian film, written, produced and directed by Biodun Stephen. The story (narrated in a non-linear manner) is centered around the life of a young woman, Ehisoje who is being emotionally and physically abused by her mother, who blames her for her unmarried status, which has limited her prestige as a woman. After several failed relationships, her mother finally settles for a man who sexually abuses Ehisoje, but she doesn't  mind as long as she remains married. She renders Ehisoje homeless after she got pregnant for her step-father.

Cast 
 Enado Odigie as Ehisoje
 Deyemi Okanlawon as Korede
 Debby Felix as young Ehisoje
 Fathia Williams as Ehisoje's Mother
 Joshua Richard as Eli/Elijah
 Tomiwa Tegbe as young Korede

Reception 
Nollywood Reinvented gave it a 2.5/5 rating, and applauded the acting and use of a revised version of "Bia Nulu", a song originally written by Onyeka Onwenu as soundtrack. It also praised the message of the film, in revisiting the unfairness in the patriarchal structure in many Nigerian societies. The film was criticized for being overly long, unprofessional video formulations and excessive prosthetic. True Nollywood Story titled its review Technical Challenges Wear Off Large Chunk Of Brilliance In “Ehis’ Bitters”, But It Still Manages To Remain A Movie That’ll Touch You. In the review, it praised the story, casting and acting but panned the appropriateness of the diction of Fathia Balogun, makeup and cinematography. Speaking about her role in the film, Felix (played Ehisoje) stated that in order to keep her character in the film alive during shooting, she trained her mind to be moody and unhappy throughout the time. She also explained that she wasn't surprised at the positive reviews she got after the release of the film.

References 

Films about rape
2018 films
Films about child abuse
Nigerian romantic drama films